Harish Kumar (born 22 October 1989) is an Indian cricketer. He made his Twenty20 debut for Tamil Nadu in the 2016–17 Inter State Twenty-20 Tournament on 29 January 2017.

References

External links
 

1989 births
Living people
Indian cricketers
Tamil Nadu cricketers
Place of birth missing (living people)